The list of participants in the ISDT/ISDE (International Six Days Enduro) since the beginning event in 1913 that saw US citizens as contestants is divided into four segments; Ambassadors, Trailblazer, Pioneers and Qualified/Selected Participants 1971 and beyond. Ambassadors are men and women who competed in ISDT/ISDE at least 10 times in their career. Trailblazer is one man on a very early motorcycle. Pioneers were on more modern motorcycles. Qualified/Selected riders are 1971 and later participants who rode in AMA qualifiers or were appointed by the AMA based on prior performances.

Participants

Ambassadors
Riding in 10 or more ISDT/ISDE Events

Trailblazer
1913

Pioneers

1949-1970

Qualified/Selected Competitors (AMA/FIM)
1971–Present

Origin of 'Skunk Stripe' helmet 
Every country participating in the International Six Days is designated by the colors adorned on their helmets. Since the first official US Team the colors were blue with white stripes. The origin of which is fuzzy at best but there are some very good indicators of where the design actually came from.

Starting in 1951 the Cunningham racing team added racing stripes to their cars to easily identify them during the a racing. These evolved from the traditional FIA (Fédération Internationale de l'Automobile) registered US Racing colors of a white body and blue chassis which dated from when racing cars had the chassis exposed. The two blue stripes were a symbolic echo of the chassis colors. In 1959 the FIA instructed drivers to add a country color to their helmets similar to British Racing green. Dan Gurney of Ferrari decided to run a blue helmet with a white stripe. He only ran the helmet for 2 years as he felt it was bad luck with a string of sub par finishes.

In 1964 the first official US ISDT Team was organized and Bell helmets supplied the team. The helmets that they supplied were blue with 3 white stripes on them. Later Bell became the official helmet supplier for the team and the "Skunk Stripe" was further developed and stuck as the designation of the US ISDE Team. While the "Skunk Stripes" have evolved slightly and Arai is now the official Helmet provider of the US ISDE Team, with Tagger being the official US ISDE Trophy team painter, the blue and white still holds a special spot in the hearts of all of the riders on this list below.

See also 
Origin of the Racing Stripe – Racing stripe
AMA National Motocross Championships – AMA Motocross Championship
AMA Supercross Championships – AMA Supercross Championship
Baja 1000 Wins – Baja 1000

References

External links 
Dan Gurney Racing Stripe
Bell helmets providing Skunk Stripe Helmet
AMA National Hare and Hound Championships
AMA GNCC Championships
AMA National Enduro Championships
AMA Hall of Fame

Motorcycle racing in the United States
Motorcycle racing teams
1913 in American motorsport
1913 establishments in the United States